Deng Yanping (born 2 June 1987) is a Chinese lightweight rower.

At the 2003 World Rowing Championships in Milan, Italy, she won a gold medal in the lightweight women's quadruple sculls. At the next world championships in 2004 in Banyoles in Catalonia, Spain, she defended her world championship title in that boat class.

References

Chinese female rowers
1987 births
Living people
World Rowing Championships medalists for China